Alvin Francis Bullock (September 18, 1906 – March 14, 1993) was a provincial politician from Alberta, Canada. He served as a member of the Legislative Assembly of Alberta from 1967 to 1971 sitting with the Social Credit caucus in government.

Political career
Bullock ran for a seat to the Alberta Legislature in the 1967 Alberta general election. He defeated incumbent Edgar Hinman in a nomination race to become the Social Credit candidate for Cardston. In the election Bullock won a tight race over Progressive Conservative candidate Larry Lang to hold the seat for his party. He did not re-offer after the legislature was dissolved in 1971.

References

External links
Legislative Assembly of Alberta Members Listing

Alberta Social Credit Party MLAs
Canadian Latter Day Saints
1908 births
1993 deaths